The Flag of the Colony of Aden was used as the official flag for the British Colony of Aden  from 1937 until 18 January 1963 when it was renamed the State of Aden and subsequently used the Flag of the State of Aden under the  Federation of South Arabia. However, there is evidence that the flag was used after 1963 in Perim and the Kuria Muria islands.

A navy blue flag with the Union jack in the top left corner, it featured a badge like that of colonial Zanzibar, with a two-masted Arab dhow sailing on turquoise waters, designed by George Kruger-Gray of the Royal Mint.

References

Colony of Aden
Aden
Colony of Aden
20th century in the Colony of Aden
Colony of Aden